Azuoma Dike (born 7 December 1989) is a Nigerian basketball player for Kano Pillars and the Nigerian national team.

With Nigeria, Dike participated at the AfroBasket 2017.

References

1989 births
Living people
Nigerian men's basketball players
Sportspeople from Lagos
Kano Pillars BC players
Guards (basketball)
Basketball players at the 2018 Commonwealth Games
African Games bronze medalists for Nigeria
African Games medalists in basketball
African Games gold medalists for Nigeria
Competitors at the 2011 All-Africa Games
Commonwealth Games competitors for Nigeria
21st-century Nigerian people